Lynyrd Skynyrd is a Southern rock band from Jacksonville, Florida. Formed in 1964, the group originally included vocalist Ronnie Van Zant, guitarists Gary Rossington and Allen Collins, bassist Larry Junstrom and drummer Bob Burns. The current lineup features guitarist and vocalist Rickey Medlocke (from 1971 to 1972, and since 1996), lead vocalist Johnny Van Zant (since 1987), drummer Michael Cartellone (since 1999), guitarist Mark Matejka (since 2006), keyboardist Peter Keys (since 2009) and bassist Keith Christopher (since 2017). The band also tours with two backing vocalists, currently Dale Krantz-Rossington (since 1987) and Carol Chase (since 1996).

History

1964–1977
Lynyrd Skynyrd was formed under the name My Backyard in 1964, which was later changed to The Noble Five, and again to One Percent. The group originally included vocalist Ronnie Van Zant, guitarists Gary Rossington and Allen Collins, bassist Larry Junstrom and drummer Bob Burns, all of whom were students at Robert E. Lee High School. After performing live for several years, the band recorded for the first time in 1971, when Junstrom and Burns were replaced by Greg T. Walker and Rickey Medlocke, respectively. The following year, Walker was replaced by the band's original choice of bassist Leon Wilkeson, and Medlocke moved to third guitarist as Burns returned on drums. Medlocke had left by the end of the year. Billy Powell had also been added as the group's first keyboardist, having worked as a roadie since 1970.

Shortly before recording began for the band's debut album (Pronounced 'Lĕh-'nérd 'Skin-'nérd), Wilkeson left Lynyrd Skynyrd and was replaced by Ed King. Later during the sessions the bassist returned, with King subsequently taking up the role of third guitarist. Burns remained for 1974's Second Helping, but left in January 1975 due to touring fatigue, with Artimus Pyle taking his place. King left on May 26, 1975, two months after the release of Nuthin' Fancy. He was replaced the following year by Steve Gaines, who was recommended by his sister Cassie Gaines after she had recently joined as one of the band's touring backing vocalists, The Honkettes.

On October 20, 1977 – three days after the release of the band's fifth studio album Street Survivors – a chartered plane on which the members and crew were travelling crashed in Gillsburg, Mississippi. Six people died in the accident, including band members Ronnie Van Zant, Steve Gaines and Cassie Gaines; many of the other passengers on board were seriously injured, including Wilkeson who was left in a critical condition and reportedly declared dead three times. The group disbanded after the crash. In 1978, a collection of previously unreleased recordings from 1971 and 1972 was released as Skynyrd's First and... Last. The following year, the surviving members (with the exception of Wilkeson) reunited at Volunteer Jam for a performance of "Free Bird" with Charlie Daniels and his band.

1987 onwards
In July 1987, Lynyrd Skynyrd announced their reforming for the Lynyrd Skynyrd Tribute Tour, with returning members Rossington, King, Wilkeson, Pyle and Powell joined by new lead vocalist Johnny Van Zant, Ronnie's younger brother. Collins, who was unable to join the reunited group after a car accident the previous year left him paralyzed from the waist down, chose Randall Hall from his own eponymous band to take his place on guitar. After the band's first post-reformation studio album Lynyrd Skynyrd 1991, Pyle left suddenly after a show in August, with Kurt Custer taking his place. Hall left in 1993 after the release of The Last Rebel, later suing the remaining members of the band for $500,000. Custer followed Hall out of the group the next year in order to focus on his solo career.

Hall and Custer were replaced by Mike Estes and Owen Hale, respectively, both of whom performed on the 1994 album Endangered Species. King was forced to leave the band in 1996 due to health problems, with Hughie Thomasson brought in to take his place; Estes left around the same time, with former drummer Medlocke returning to the band on guitar as a result. Hale left in late 1998 after the Twenty Tour; he was replaced first by Jeff McAllister, followed by Kenny Aronoff who played on Edge of Forever, before Michael Cartellone took over in 1999 after the dissolution of the Damn Yankees. On July 27, 2001, longtime bassist Leon Wilkeson died in his sleep of natural causes. He was replaced by Ean Evans, who had earlier substituted for Wilkeson at several shows the previous year.

Thomasson left Lynyrd Skynyrd in 2005 to reform his previous band Outlaws, with his replacement Mark Matejka joining early the next year. The band was forced to change its lineup twice in 2009 due to deaths in the group – first, longtime keyboardist Billy Powell died of a heart attack on January 28; and later, bassist Evans died of cancer on May 6. Peter Keys was later brought in to replace Powell, while Evans was replaced by Robert Kearns. Kearns remained until 2012, when he was replaced by former Black Crowes bassist Johnny Colt. Keith Christopher replaced Colt in mid-2017. Gary Rossington, the band's last founding member died on 5 March 2023.

Official members

Current members

Former members

Other contributors

Current touring musicians

Former touring musicians

Touring substitutes

Timeline

Lineups

Bibliography

References

External links
Lynyrd Skynyrd official website

Lynyrd Skynyrd